Liam Rector (born Ronald Edward Rector; November 21, 1949 – August 15, 2007) was an American poet, essayist and educator. He had administered literary programs at the Association of Writers and Writing Programs (AWP), the National Endowment for the Arts, the Academy of American Poets, and the Folger Shakespeare Library. He was also the founder of the graduate Writing Seminars program at Bennington College.

Life and work

Ronald Edward Rector was born in Washington, D.C.; he adopted the name Liam in adulthood. He was educated at various undergraduate programs but did not receive a bachelor's degree; he did, however, receive master's degrees in writing from Johns Hopkins University and in public administration from the Harvard Kennedy School. He was the author of volumes of poetry including The Executive Director of the Fallen World (University of Chicago, 2006), American Prodigal (Story Line, 1994), and The Sorrow of Architecture (Dragon Gate, 1984).

Rector was married three times, with the first two marriages ending in divorce; he had a daughter from his second marriage. With his third wife, Tree Swenson, he edited On the Poetry of Frank Bidart: Fastening the Voice to the Page (University of Michigan, 2007), and edited The Day I Was Older: On the Poetry of Donald Hall (Story Line, 1989).

Rector founded and directed the graduate writing seminars at Bennington College in Vermont and taught at Columbia University, The New School, and Emerson College.

Rector committed suicide by gunshot in his Greenwich Village apartment on August 15, 2007, at the age of 57. He had incurred a series of health problems in his last years, including heart disease and cancer, and mentioned this in his suicide note.

Legacy
The Liam Rector First Book Prize for Poetry is awarded annually by Briery Creek Press to honor the best emerging poets with their first full-length poetry publication.

Bibliography

Poetry

 The Sorrow of Architecture: Poems. Port Townsend, WA: Dragon Gate, 1984.
  American Prodigal: Poems. Brownsville, OR: Story Line Press, 1994.
  The Executive Director of the Fallen World. Chicago: University of Chicago Press, 2006.

Editor

 The Day I Was Older: On the poetry of Donald Hall. Santa Cruz, CA: Story Line Press, 1989.
  On Frank Bidart: Fastening the voice to the page (edited with Tree Swenson). Ann Arbor, MI: University of Michigan Press, 2007.

References

External links
"An interview by Sarah Kanning.." The Free Library. 2005 World Poetry, Inc. - this interview was first published in “The American Poetry Review” (Vol. 34, No. 5 (SEPTEMBER/OCTOBER 2005), pp. 37–41 as a Special APR Supplement: Liam Rector
except from An interview by Sarah Kanning this link includes Rector poems "About the Money" and "In My Memory Eddie" published in the American Poetry Review (Sept/Oct 2005)
excerpt from The Culture Wars in a Time of War published in the American Poetry Review (Jan/Feb 2000)
Exhibit at The Academy of American Poets includes links to on-line poems and audio readings
Top N.Y. Poet Kills Self obituary from NY Post on-line
"autobiographical note" A piece Rector wrote for the Web site PoetryNet when he was their Poet of the Month for September 2004; including "When the Parents Went", one of several Rector poems published at PoetryNet when Rector was Poet of the Month during September 2004
Liam Rector First Book Prize for Poetry Poetry Prize named after Liam Rector.
Stuart A. Rose Manuscript, Archives, and Rare Book Library, Emory University: Liam Rector papers
Poems by: Liam Rector - links to four poems at the Writer’s Almanac site popularized by Garrison Keillor: “First Marriage”, “The Old Man and the Motorcycle”, “Off to the Country of Cancer”, and ”Twenty-three”

1949 births
2007 deaths
2007 suicides
20th-century American educators
20th-century American poets
21st-century American educators
21st-century American poets
American male poets
Bennington College faculty
Columbia University faculty
Emerson College faculty
Folger Shakespeare Library
Harvard Kennedy School alumni
Johns Hopkins University alumni
People from Greenwich Village
Poets from Washington, D.C.
Suicides by firearm in New York City
Writers from Manhattan